is a secondary school in Osaka, Japan founded in 1873.

It moved to its current location in Yodogawa Ward in 1931. The school is operated by the Osaka Prefectural Board of Education. It has been named a model school by the Ministry of Education, Culture, Sports, Science and Technology.

History 
Kitano High School was founded as a European-style school at Namba Mido in 1873, and re-established as Osaka Prefectural First Secondary High School in 1877. In 1889, the school was moved to the new building to at Dojima, and a school logo was also made at the same year. In 1902, the school was moved again to Kitano, and renamed Osaka Prefectural Kitano Secondary High School. After 29 years, the school was moved to the current location.

After World War II, in 1948, the school was renamed Osaka Prefectural Kitano Senior High School, and began exchange of students and teachers with Osaka Prefectural Otemae High School.

Alumni 
Prominent alumni include 
 Hidetsugu Yagi (1886-1976), inventor of the Yagi Antenna
 Osamu Hayaishi, winner of the Wolf Prize in Medicine
 Osamu Tezuka (1928-1989), manga artist
 Toshiya Kuge (1981-2001), 20-year-old September 11 victim
 Den Fujita, founder of McDonald's Company (Japan), Ltd
 Junko Abe, actress
 Kenji Kasahara
 Tōru Hashimoto, former mayor of Osaka City
Yuzo Saeki, painter
Hisaya Morishige, actor and comedian
Hiroshi Noma, author
Motojirō Kajii, author
Shika Kawajo, politician
Ryōichi Kuroda, politician
Midori Matsushima, politician
Kanae Yamamoto, politician
Tamiki Wakaki, manga artist

External links 
Kitano High School

References

Educational institutions established in 1873
1873 establishments in Japan
Education in Osaka
High schools in Osaka Prefecture